The 2017–18 Dominica Premier League is the 53rd season of the Dominica Premier League, the top tier of association football in Dominica. The season began on 25 August 2017, but was abandoned due to hurricane damage.

Standings

References 

Dominica Premiere League seasons
Dominica
football
football